Ouango may refer to:

Ouango, Bangui, Central African Republic
Ouango, Mbomou, Central African Republic
Ouango, Sangha-Mbaéré, Central African Republic
Ouango River, New Caledonia

See also
Gambo-Ouango, Central African Republic
Ouangolodougou (disambiguation)